The Voyage Home may refer to:

 Star Trek IV: The Voyage Home, a 1986 American science fiction film directed by Leonard Nimoy
 The Voyage Home (2004 film), an Italian historical drama film directed by Claudio Bondì
 "The Voyage Home" (The Outer Limits), a television episode
 The Voyage Home, a 2004 novel by Jane Rogers